Shaykh Muhammad Salamah (Arabic: محمد سلامة), born in 1899 in Musturud, Qalyubia, Egypt, and died in 1982, was a student at Al-Azhar University who memorized the Qur'an and became a Qur'anic reciter at a young age. He fought in the Egyptian Revolution of 1919 against the British. He settled in Palestine after World War I, before returning to Egypt in the 1930s.

Shaykh Salamah was the only prominent reciter to refuse to record for radio, believing it to be forbidden, until he eventually relented in 1948. In 1937 he participated in a conference of Qur'an reciters which led to the establishment of a Reciters' Association.

He was the mentor of celebrated reciters Kamil Yusuf Al-Bahtimi and Mohamed Siddiq El-Minshawi, both of whom lived and studied in Salamah's home at one point. He also taught other prominent reciters including Sayyid Darwish, Zakariyya Ahmad, and Ali Mahmud.

References

1899 births
1982 deaths
Egyptian Quran reciters
Al-Azhar University alumni